The IRL Wheelchair World Rankings are the ranking system for men's wheelchair national teams in the sport of rugby league football. The first rankings were published in June 2020.

See also

International Rugby League
RLIF Awards
IRL Women's World Rankings

References 

Rugby league trophies and awards
Sports world rankings
Wheelchair rugby league